Fatal accidents to competitors at the Hockenheimring circuit during the German Grand Prix and other national and international  motor-sport events.  The circuit was first used in 1932 using the Hockenheim "triangle course". It was rebuilt in 1938 into the "Kurpfalzring" (oval course) with the addition of the "Motodrom" stadium section in 1964.  Metal Armco barriers and chicanes was added in 1970 and a further chicane added in 1980 at the site of the Ost-Curve. The Hockenheimring was shortened  to a  Grand Prix circuit used from 2002 onwards.

List of fatal accidents involving competitors

List of fatal accidents during unofficial testing

List of fatal accidents involving race officials

Sources

See also
List of Nürburgring fatalities

Hockenheimring